Røn is a village in Vestre Slidre Municipality in Innlandet county, Norway. The European route E16 highway runs through the village.

References

Vestre Slidre
Villages in Innlandet